P'isqi P'isqi (Aymara p'isqi white quinoa, Quechua p'isqi a stew or purée of quinua, the reduplication indicates that there is a group or a complex of something, Hispanicized spelling Pesjepesje) is a mountain in the Andes of Peru, about  high. It lies in the Arequipa Region, Castilla Province, Andagua District. P'isqi P'isqi is situated west of Wakapallqa and  Llallawi.

References 

Mountains of Peru
Mountains of Arequipa Region